Finland–Kosovo relations are foreign relations between Finland and Kosovo. Kosovo declared its independence from Serbia on 17 February 2008 and Finland recognised it on 7 March 2008. Finland maintains an embassy in Pristina.

History
In 1999, the President of Finland, Martti Ahtisaari, was reported as wanting to step up attempts to secure a peace agreement for Kosovo in his new role as a leading negotiator for the European Union. It was also reported that "Correspondents say that despite Mr Ahtisaari's support for air strikes, his position as president of a non-NATO country could make him palatable to Belgrade [Serbian Government]." In 2007, United Nations envoy for Kosovo says independence was the "only viable option" for the territory of Kosovo.

However, Ahtisaari's plan for peace failed  and he was unable to reconcile Serbs and Albanians in Kosovo and that "Serbians see him as a leading player in the break-up of their country."  

Following Kosovo's declaration of independence from Serbia in 2008, Kosovo Albanians living in Finland celebrated and expressed their gratitude to the Finnish Government and President Ahtisaari.

Military

As of 2009, Finland has 411 troops serving in Kosovo as peacekeepers in the NATO led Kosovo Force.

See also 

 Foreign relations of Finland
 Foreign relations of Kosovo 
 Finland–Serbia relations
 Finland–Yugoslavia relations

Notes and references

 
Bilateral relations of Kosovo
Kosovo